Bunny McDiarmid ( born 1957 or 1958 in Christchurch) is an environmental activist from New Zealand, she has been, (with Jennifer Morgan) Executive Director of the non-governmental organization Greenpeace International since April 4, 2016. She has been an activist for more than 30 years, leading national and international campaigns including in her native New Zealand. She began her career at Greenpeace as a volunteer on the Rainbow Warrior in 1984. She established a regional office in the Pacific working on climate, forests and oceans. She also coordinated the international nuclear and deep sea work for several years. She is a shareholder in the Awaawaroa eco-village.

References 

People associated with Greenpeace
New Zealand environmentalists
New Zealand women environmentalists
New Zealand women activists
New Zealand activists
Living people
Year of birth missing (living people)